The International Quidditch Association (IQA), also known as the International Quadball Association, is the governing body for the sport of quidditch. It was founded as the Intercollegiate Quidditch Association in 2009 following the very first intercollegiate quidditch match. In 2010, the IQA added the "international" term to its name, and 2016 saw its induction as an international sports federation with its creation of the Congress. It now comprises more than ten national associations governing quidditch in their respective nations.

The IQA was founded on the campus of Middlebury College, in Vermont; the International Quidditch Association, then Intercollegiate Quidditch Association, being the outgrowth of wildly popular on-campus tournaments. The association is responsible for the organization of the world's major quidditch tournaments and events, most notably the IQA Global Games, as well as international rule setting and worldwide expansion.

Governance
The IQA has three levels of governance, the most powerful being the Congress, in which each member league has its own voice.

Membership

Full members
A member, being a national governing body (NGB) of that region/territory, is the representation of a region's quidditch activity at the IQA level. Each NGB receives between one and three delegates, all of whom receive one vote apiece, but all the delegates from a specific NGB must vote as a bloc. The number of delegates afforded an NGB are proportional to its QDI. NGBs are also required to offer an annual culminating championship tournament.

As of 2022, the full member NGBs are:
  Argentinian Quidditch Association (AQArg)
  Quidditch Australia (QAI)
  Quidditch Austria (QAT)
  Belgian Quidditch Federation (BQF)
  Quidditch Canada (QC)
  Catalan Quidditch Association (AQC)
  French Quidditch Federation (FQF)
  German Quidditch Federation (DQB)
  Italian Quidditch Association (AIQ)
  Quidditch México (QMX)
  Quidditch Nederland (QNL)
  Norwegian Quidditch Association (NRF)
  Peruvian Quidditch Sports Federation (FDPQ)
  Polish Quidditch League (PLQ)
  Spanish Quidditch Association (AQE)
  Swiss Quadball Association (SQV/ASQ)
  Quidditch Association in Turkey (QD)
  QuadballUK (QUK)
  US Quadball (USQ)

Associate members
Associate member NGBs have two teams or more and a QDI below the threshold set by the IQA and are entitled to an independent voice in the IQA Congress but cannot vote. Developing NGBs are required to have evidence of regular competitive play.

As of 2022, the associate member NGBs are:
  Brazilian Quidditch Association (ABRQ)
  Chilean Quidditch Association
  Czech Quidditch Association (CQA)
  Danish Quidditch Association
  Hong Kong Quidditch Association
  Quidditch Ireland (QIRE)
  Japan Quidditch Association (JQA)
  Quidditch Korea
  Quidditch Malaysia
  Quidditch Association of New Zealand
  Slovak Quidditch Association (SQA)
  Quidditch Association of Slovenia
  Swedish Quidditch Federation (SvQF)
  Quidditch Uganda
  Vietnam Quidditch Association

Areas of Interest

  Quidditch Ghana
  Quidditch Portugal
  Quidditch Pakistan

Formely listed Associate members
These nations are no longer listed on the IQA's website under members but were in the past.

As of 2022 these are:
  Quidditch Finland
  Hungarian Quidditch Association (MKSZ)
  Quidditch Association of Iceland (QSÍ)
  Quidditch Israel
  Serbian Quidditch Association*

Continental committees
Under the IQA, there can exist groups of NGBs that work together to form a committee devoted to promoting the sport within the region. The only current committee in existence is the European Committee for Quidditch (or Quidditch Europe). It is composed of two representatives from all NGBs within Europe, even those that do not have full representation at the IQA-level. Quidditch Europe is in charge of the yearly tournament, the European Quidditch Cup, which contests the best teams across the continent, as well as the European Games, where national teams from Europe come together to compete every other year.

History
Quidditch, then known as "muggle quidditch," began in 2005 as an intramural league at Middlebury College in Vermont. The rules were adapted from J.K. Rowling’s Harry Potter novels by Alex Benepe and Alexander Manshel. Manshel served as the first Quidditch Commissioner.

In 2006, Alex Benepe took over as the Middlebury Commissioner and in 2007, founded the Intercollegiate Quidditch Association following the first intercollegiate quidditch match between Middlebury College and Vassar College on November 11, 2007.

Since then, the IQA has helped students from more than 400 colleges and 300 high schools form teams, and over half of them are active already. The vast majority are based in the US, where quidditch is represented in 45 states. US teams are split into eight regions: Northeast, Mid-Atlantic, South, Midwest, Southwest, West, Northwest, and the Great Lakes. Other countries with teams or leagues that play by IQA rules include Australia, Brazil, Canada, Colombia, France, Germany, Vietnam, Mexico, New Zealand, Peru, Malaysia, and the United Kingdom.

In 2010, the IQA changed its name to the International Quidditch Association and became a registered non-profit organization. Today, the IQA is composed of the Commissioner/CEO, other executive staff (the COO and CTO), a board of directors, seven departmental directors (Development, Gameplay, Human Resources, IT, Marketing, Membership, and Teams), and an extensive volunteer staff that includes regional directors and state representatives. There is also an extensive volunteer staff for major events such as QuidCon, a convention for players and other interested parties, and the World Cup.

The IQA serves to promote quidditch as a new sport and lead outreach programs to increase athletic participation among children and young adults and bring magic to communities. The Marketing, Development, and Teams departments are particularly dedicated to this aspect of the sport. One promotional tool is the magazine Quidditch Quarterly, which is the official magazine of the IQA and the only publication dedicated to the sport of quidditch.

On March 19, 2014, the IQA announced that the structure would change dramatically. The IQA will transition to become the USQ (United States Quidditch), taking much of its staff, and the new IQA will be composed of an international body titled the IQA Congress, whose job it is to facilitate and oversee quidditch development around the world, including within the United States and Canada. The Congress will be made up of delegates from each country where quidditch has a presence, as well as a smaller standing staff. It took effect July 1, 2014, before Global Games in Burnaby, B.C., Canada.

In July 2022, the IQA announced plans to change its name to the International Quadball Association, attempting to re-brand the sport, both to avoid future confrontation with Warner Bros. Entertainment over their trademark of the term "Quidditch", and to distance the sport from JK Rowling due to her statements concerning transgender people.

Rules of the sport

The IQA publishes through its own rules department a set of updated rules each year that teams registered with a national association must adhere to during any and all international play. For the 2014–15, the IQA will use USQ's published Rulebook 8 in every and all tournaments except for the 2014 Global Games. It is up to the member league itself to determine whether or not they wish to adhere to every IQA rule, but member leagues must follow the IQA rules in international play or unless another set of rules is agreed upon.

In brief, quidditch is a co-ed contact sport with a unique mix of elements from rugby, dodgeball, and tag. A team is made up of seven athletes who play with brooms between their legs at all times.

Three chasers score goals worth 10 points each with the quaffle. They advance the ball down the field by running with it, passing it to teammates, or kicking it. Each team has a keeper who defends the goal hoops. Two beaters use bludgers to disrupt the flow of the game by “knocking out” other players. Any player hit by a bludger is out of play until they touch their own goals. Each team also has a seeker who tries to catch the snitch. The snitch is a ball attached to the waistband of the snitch runner, a neutral athlete and referee in a yellow uniform who uses any means to avoid capture. The snitch is worth 30 points, and its capture ends the game. If the score is tied after the snitch catch, the game proceeds into overtime.

During play, players are forbidden from taking certain actions. Players who commit fouls face different consequences depending on the severity of the offense. A back to hoops foul indicates that a player must stop and return to their hoops, as though knocked out. A yellow card indicates that a player must spend one minute in the penalty box. A red card indicates that a player is barred from the rest of the game.

Snitching and seeking
One unique aspect to the sport of quidditch is the usage of a snitch, a neutral athlete as well as a referee, to end the game. The snitching game is one of wrestling and running where seekers combat each other as well as the snitch. The snitch is able to defend themself in any way possible except for climbing buildings and trees. Certain tournaments stipulate actions that are off limit to snitches depending on the circumstances, but generally snitches have a full range of motions.

In 2014, then-IQA now-USQ officials polled the quidditch community on the notion of abolishing off-pitch seeking, where the snitch and seekers are allowed to travel outside of the pitch during game time. As participants needed to be official tournament members as per the 2013-14 rules, many European, Australian and Canadian players where barred from participating which resulted in backlash from the European quidditch community. Ultimately, it was published in Rulebook 8 under rule 8.3.3 to disallow off-pitch seeking, forcing the snitch to stay within the pitch after the initial 17 minute seeker floor. The IQA has yet to officially adopt Rulebook 8 and all of its nuances, so it is unknown if the entire quidditch community is restricted by this ruling or just US Quidditch.

Title 9 ¾
Since its inception, the IQA has sought equality on the pitch in terms of gender. One of the most strict requirements is that "each team [is] to have at least two players on the field who identify with a different gender than at least two other players. The gender that a player identifies with is considered to be that player’s gender, which may or may not be the same as that person’s sex." Because of this wording, quidditch is becoming a leader of sports for equal basing for both women and the LGBT community. As of 2013, the IQA has created Title 9 ¾, a branch of the IQA that actively promotes advocacy and awareness as well as gender equality and inclusivity.

However, this policy has drawn sharp criticism from single sex institutions for whom it is difficult or impossible to attract players of the opposite gender. Women's teams from Smith College and Wellesley College were prohibited from tournament play because of this rule.

IQA membership
To compete in the World Cup, teams must be registered IQA members. However, due to the IQA's gender rule which encourages gender equality, some teams (any single-sex schools) are excluded from playing, like Smith College and Wellesley College. For the 2013-14 season, the IQA has changed its membership policy to reflect its movement towards a more established sport. The policy includes two forms of membership: regular and tournament as well as individual membership. Teams in North America must subscribe to be tournament-level teams to be allowed to go to their regional tournament and thus qualify for the World Cup, whereas non-North American teams can qualify through their regionals on just a basic membership.

For the 2014-15 season, membership will change once more, where there will be a minimal, per-team IQA fee (to be decided) and fees decided by each member country. US Quidditch has released their fee structure as of 20 March 2014.

Tournaments

IQA World Cup

The World Cup is the IQA's tournament for national teams. Any quidditch-playing nation is offered the chance at competing on the world level at this tournament. The latest iteration was held in Florence, Italy in June/July 2018, with the US taking first place and Belgium coming in second.

The original World Cup was titled both "Summer Games" to match the Olympics being held in London, UK and "Global Games." July 2012 saw five national teams from around the world compete in this first international tournament run by the IQA, taking place in University Parks, Oxford, England. The five teams were from the US, Canada, France, UK, and Australia.

European Games

The IQA European Games is the regional tournament held every off-year alongside the World Cup. The inaugural Games were held in Sarteano, Italy in July 2015 which saw 12 nations compete with France being the winner over the UK.

Former

Until 2014, the IQA organized the previous iteration of what is now the US Quidditch Cup, known at the time as the IQA World Cup. To compete, registered teams were required to participate in their regional tournaments, of which 2014 had nine regions (seven in North America, one for Europe and one for Oceania). Each region received a certain number of bids at the beginning of the season, and teams who placed within that number of bids were offered a spot at the World Cup.

Being in the United States each year drew criticism from the rest of the quidditch world, where Australia fostered a solid quidditch community, and Europe was consistently growing. 2014, the last year the World Cup in this function was held, saw all European teams refuse their bids due to costs and desire to support a more international IQA with their attendance at the Global Games.

The tournament continues as the US Quidditch Cup, an American club tournament, with the World Cup name moving to the national team tournament.

See also

 Quidditch (real-life sport)
 Quidditch Canada
 Belgium Muggle Quidditch
 QuadballUK
 Muggle Quidditch Nederland
 Quidditch Benelux

References

External links
IQA website
International Quidditch Rules
World Cub VIII
World Cup VII
Title 9 ¾

Quidditch governing bodies
International sports organizations
Sports organizations established in 2005